The Karpathos frog (Pelophylax cerigensis) is a species of frog in the family Ranidae. It is endemic to the island of Karpathos, South Aegean Sea, Greece. The Karpathos frog is considered the most endangered anuran amphibian in Europe because its range is restricted to two small rivers in the north part of the island.

Its natural habitats are Mediterranean-type shrubby vegetation, rivers, intermittent rivers, freshwater lakes, intermittent freshwater lakes, freshwater marshes, intermittent freshwater marshes, arable land and ponds. It is threatened by habitat loss.

References

Sources

Pafilis, P., Kapsalas, G., Lymberakis, P., Protopappas, D., & Sotiropoulos, K. (2018). Diet composition of the Karpathos marsh frog (Pelophylax cerigensis): what does the most endangered frog in Europe eat? Animal Biodiversity and Coservation, 42(1), 1–8. doi: 10.32800/abc.2018.42.0001
Beerli, P. & Uzzell, T. 2004.  Rana cerigensis.   2006 IUCN Red List of Threatened Species.  Downloaded on 23 July 2007.

Amphibians of Europe
Pelophylax
Endemic fauna of Greece
Amphibians described in 1994
Dodecanese
Taxonomy articles created by Polbot